The Nawabs of Masulipatam ruled under the Nizam in eastern India. The best known of them was Nawab Haji Hassan Khan.

Their title later became Nawab of Banganapalle as they shifted from Masulipatam to Banganapalle. They belong to the Najm-i-Sani Dynasty.

List of nawabs
The Najm-i-Sani dynasty

See also
Nawab of Banganapalle
Nizam of Hyderabad
Nawab of Carnatic

Nawabs of India
People from Hyderabad State